Dijujin (also Romanized as Dījūjīn; also known as Vījūjīn) is a village in Sardabeh Rural District, in the Central District of Ardabil County, Ardabil Province, Iran. At the 2016 census, its population was 1,144, in 348 families.Dijvijin means the castle of Bijan ( Persian :دِژِ بیژن ).

References 

Towns and villages in Ardabil County